Mr. Right Wanted is a 2014 Taiwanese comedy, romance television series produced by UDN Productions, starring Sonia Sui, Christopher Lee, Kuo Shu-yao, Jerry Huang, Hans Chung, Chang Shao Huai, and Emerson Tsai. Filming began on December 23, 2013 and finished on June 7, 2014. First original broadcast began November 7, 2014 on TTV channel airing on Friday nights from 10:00-12:00 pm.

Synopsis
When a woman tackles online dating, is it for work, is it to get back at her ex-boyfriend, or is it to fill a void in her life? Li Hai Ning (Sonia Sui) is a 32-year-old editor-in-chief of a publishing company that is struggling to find a bestseller. Fang Cheng Hao (Jerry Huang), Hai Ning's boyfriend of nine years, is the only author doing well in her company but even his book sales have begun to stagnate. As Hai Ning is preparing for Cheng Hao's new book, she discovers some major misdeeds that he has done and Hai Ning becomes enraged. Leaving him, Hai Ning also decides to write the new book herself – a book about online dating and marriage – with a simple online ad that states: “Female, 32 years old. Looking for men who are upright, kind and willing to communicate. Hoping to be friends first before marriage.” As Hai Ning begins to meet with an endless stream of potential marriage candidates and then meets Benjamin (Christopher Lee), will he help Hai Ning finish her the experiment and the book?

Cast

Main cast
Sonia Sui as Li Hai Ning 李海寧
Christopher Lee as Lun Zhe Ming (Benjamin) 倫哲明（Banjamin）
Kuo Shu-yao as Tian Xin 田欣
Jerry Huang as Fang Cheng Hao 方成皓
 鍾承翰 as He Zhong Wen 何仲文
 張少懷 as Mao Zhen Yu (Yu Zhou) 毛振宇（宇宙）
Emerson Tsai as Zhang Jia Qiang (Xiao Qiang) 張家強（小強）

Supporting cast
 高盟傑 as Xie Jin Fa (Ah Fa) 謝晉發（阿發）
Dai Ruo Mei 戴若梅 as Zhang Mei Feng (Ah Feng) 張美鳳（阿鳳）
Fang Jing 方靖 as Wen Bei Si (Bei Bei) 溫蓓思（貝貝）
 黃荻鈞 as Liu Ya Zhu 柳雅竹

Extended cast
 吳怡霈 as Pei Pei 佩佩
He Man Ning 何曼寧 as General Manager of Star Publishing
Huang Yan Bo 黃彥博 as Tian Tian 田天
 程政鈞 as Tian Xin and Tian Tian's father
 梁又南 as Tian Xin and Tian Tian's mother
Lin Zhi Yi 林致毅 as Pei Pei's husband
Chen Wei Min 陳偉民 as second-hand bookstore owner
Tsai Jia Yin 蔡嘉茵 as job applicant
Qian Wan Jing 錢婉靜 as job applicant
Liang Ya Qing 梁亞青 as job applicant
Chen Xiu Ying 程秀瑛 as Mao Zhen Yu's mother
Wang De Sheng 王德生 as Mao Zhen Yu's father
Lin Hong Ru 林鴻儒 as snack bar owner
Xu Yi Xin 許義昕 as violinist
 嚴藝文 as Qiu Xin Yin (Xiao Qiu) 邱馨芸（小邱）
Aviis Zhong 鍾瑤 as Paul's ex-girlfriend
 李律 as Paul's junior schoolmate
Fu Zi Xuan 傅子瑄 as female military instructor
Gao Tian Fa 高天發 as boss of debt collection company
 許乃涵 as Zhang Jia Qi (Xiao Qi) 張佳琪（小琪）
Zheng Zhong Min 鄭仲珉 as bartender
Chen Pin Chun 陳品淳 as Xu Tian Ming's late wife
Wu Shi Yang 吳世陽 as Mr. Lun's butler
Zhang Yi De 張一德 as Mr. Lun's chauffeur
Guan Jin Zong 管謹宗 as Director Ye
Amanda as Adele
Chen Jian Kai 陳建凱 as copyright agent
 楊達敬 as Yang Da Jing 楊達敬（Gordon）(voice only) / Xu Lei's senior
Chen Zeng Liang 陳增良 / Ke Hong Zhi 柯泓志 (voice only) as real Sun Guo Fu 孫國復
Tatyana as Lena
Liu Guan Ting 劉冠廷 as Jian Si (Kenji) 健司（Kenji）
 孫睿 as Kenji's wife
Li Li Hao 李笠豪 as boxing match competitor
Wu Zhen Ya 吳震亞 as boxing match referee
Qiu Chun Fu 邱春福 as Rocky's father
Wu Bi Lian 吳碧蓮 as Rocky's mother
Zhang Wen Song 張文松 as Director Xu
Huang Xiang Yu 黃湘郁 as Xu Tai 徐太
 張家慧 as Ye Xiao Lin 葉曉琳
Qian Xiao Li 錢曉麗 as Anna 安娜
Wang En De 王恩德 as producer
Feng Wei 馮薇 as spa hotel staff
 陳子胤 as wedding shop employee
Lang Tsu-yun 郎祖筠 as Hao Bi Jiao 郝碧嬌
Lin Dong Xu 林東緒 as Hao Bi Jiao's boyfriend
Zhang Yu Huan 張語歡 as Xiao Ma's sister
Huang Yu Ting 黃鈺婷 as wedding shop employee
 朱德剛 as priest
Chen Wan Hao 陳萬號 as restaurant owner
Huang Yu Qing 黃玉麒 as lottery line owner
Li Min Jie 李旻潔 as hospital volunteer
Li Jun Sheng 李俊陞 as hospital volunteer
 謝沛恩 as Xiao Lu 小綠
Lu Fu Ling 呂馥伶 as Mickey
Li Pei Xuan 李姵璇 as drugs buyer
Zhang Wei Ling 張瑋玲 as You Xin 宥心
Yu Yue Ru 余月如 as motel front desk clerk
Zhuo Fang Qi 卓芳琦 as school student
Lin Xu Fan 林栩帆 as Xiao Qiang's coworker
Wan Zong Yu 萬宗瑜 as Xiao Qiang's coworker
Duan Zheng Ping 段正平 as physician
Esther Yang 陽詠存 as Li Yi Ping 李依萍
 (aka Nick Yen) 星星王子 as astrology expert
Zhuang Yi Ting 莊貽婷 as restaurant waiter
Zhou Si Ting 周思廷 as passenger
 陳玉珊 as thief
Ding Pei 丁霈 as Fiona
Xu Yi Shao 許逸紹 as bicycle courier manager
Amanda Chu 朱芯儀 as Wei Wei 薇薇
Si Ta Fan 斯塔凡 as copyright agent
Wang Han Zhe 王漢哲 as Lei Ti Sha 蕾緹莎（Laetitia Huggings）
Shi Shang You 史尚右 as Taiwan broker
Hong Yun Zhu 洪韵筑 as translator
 許時豪 as Rui Huan's college friend
Su Ting Hui 蘇庭卉 as Dr. Lee
Wang Han Zhe 王漢哲 as Dr. Lee's assistant
 杜姸 as model of Chuan Bo Gong Si
 連奕琦 as director of Chuan Bo Gong Si
Li Jia Heng 李佳衡 as 有詞美少女
 楊閔 as Lin Yun (Teacher Lin) 林韻（林老師）
Wu Ying Xuan 吳映軒 as household registration office staff
Ma Jing Yi 馬敬宜 as Hai Ning's roommate
Yang Qian Yao 楊千瑤 as Hai Ning's roommate
Wang Jing Jiang 王靖江 as second-hand bookstore owner
Cui Ruo Qiang 崔若強 as obstetricians
Yu Yuan Long 余元竉 as Ah Feng's husband

Cameos
 柯叔元 as Zhao Pei Nian 趙培年（Alex Chao）
 馬念先 as Paul 保羅
 王夢麟 as Xu Tian Ming 許天鳴
 賴佩霞 as Sun Guo Fu 孫國復
 黃尚禾 as Xiang Yin Zheng 向銀正（Rocky）
Sphinx Ting 丁春誠 as Pei Xin Wei (Xiao Shuai) 裴信緯（小帥）
Sunny Wang 王陽明 as Xiao Ma 小馬
Bryan Chang as Lucifer 路西法
Chris Wu 吳慷仁 as Xu Lei 徐磊
 高英軒 as Liao Song Shan 廖松山
Michio Hayashida 米七偶 as Haruo Sato / Zuo Teng Chun Fu (in Chinese) 佐藤春夫
Yukihiko Kageyama as Masahiko Sato / Zuo Teng Zhen Yan (in Chinese) 佐藤真彥
Duncan Chow 周群達 as Jia Rui Huan 賈瑞寰
Wu Pong-fong 吳朋奉 as Liang Kai Ming 梁開明
Chin Shih-chieh 金士傑 as Yu Wen 余文
Chien Te-men 乾德門 as Gu Shi Yong 古時雍

Soundtrack

Mr. Right Wanted Original TV Soundtrack (OST) (徵婚啟事 電視原聲帶) was released on December 5, 2014 by various artists under Rock Records. It contains 16 tracks total, in which 4 songs are various instrumental versions of the songs. The opening theme is track 1 "No Sincerity No Love 無誠勿愛" by 831 八三夭, while the closing theme is track 2 "What Once Was Lost, Now Is Found 半婚迷" by Shi Shi 孫盛希.

Track listing

Songs not featured on the official soundtrack album.
Sleep by Grayshot

Broadcast

Episode ratings

Awards and nominations

References

External links
Mr. Right Wanted TTV Official website 
Mr. Right Wanted GTV Website 
 

2014 Taiwanese television series debuts
2015 Taiwanese television series endings
Gala Television original programming
Television shows based on Taiwanese novels